Danger in the Pacific  is a 1942 espionage thriller set on a fictional island during World War II.

Plot
As a cover for his true government mission, British intelligence agent Leo Marzell (Leo Carrillo) sponsors a scientific expedition led by Dr. David Lynd (Don Terry) to find a source for a wonder drug in the jungles of the South Pacific.  When Lynd agrees to the expedition over the objections of his aviator fiancée Jane Claymore (Louise Allbritton), she breaks the engagement but secretly follows him to the island. Claymore attempts to halt Lynd's expedition so they can be married, but makes the mistake of recruiting Axis espionage agent Zambesi (Edgar Barrier) to help her. Native islander Tagani (Turhan Bey) is sent by Zambesi to murder Lynd, and sets loose a tiger that injures Marzell.  Most of Lynd's guides are attacked by crocodiles, but one survives to kill Tagani. Claymore ends up saving Marzall, Lynd and the remainder of the expedition by contacting the Royal Air Force which sends a rescue squad.

Cast
Leo Carrillo – Leo Marzell
Don Terry – Dr. David Lynd
Louise Allbritton – Jane Claymore
Andy Devine – Andy Parker
Turhan Bey – Tagani
Edgar Barrier – Zambesi

References

External links
 
 
 
 

1942 films
1940s English-language films
1940s thriller drama films
American black-and-white films
World War II films made in wartime
American thriller drama films
Films directed by Lewis D. Collins
Universal Pictures films
1942 drama films